Azor is an Argentine–French–Swiss drama film directed by Andreas Fontana, with a screenplay by Fontana and Mariano Llinás. The film stars Fabrizio Rongione and Stephanie Cléau.

The film had its worldwide premiere in 2021 at the 71st Berlin International Film Festival in the Encounters section.

Cast
The cast includes:
 Fabrizio Rongione as Yvan
 Stephanie Cléau as Inés
 Elli Medeiros as Magdalena Padel Camon
 Alexandre Trocki as Frydmer
 Gilles Privat as Lombier
 Juan Pablo Geretto as Dekerman
 Carmen Iriondo as Viuda
 Yvain Juillard as Lombier
 Pablo Torre Nilson as Tatoski
 Juan Trench as Padel Camon

Production 
Paul Courlet provided the music.

Release
Rights to Azor in the US, UK, Ireland, Italy, India, and Turkey were purchased by streaming platform Mubi following its premiere at the Berlin International Film Festival.

Reception
 On Metacritic, the film has a weighted average score of 88 out of 100, based on 16 critics, indicating "universal acclaim".

References

External links
 

2021 films
French drama films
Swiss drama films
Argentine drama films
2021 directorial debut films
2020s French films